Furnished Room (German:Möblierte Zimmer) is a 1929 German silent film directed by Fred Sauer and starring Margot Landa, Fritz Schulz and Hans Albers.

The film's art director was Max Heilbronner.

Cast
 Margot Landa as Lilly  
 Fritz Schulz as Harry  
 Hans Albers as Edler von Stepanowic  
 Hertha von Walther as Käthe  
 Yvette Darnys as Baronin Tiefenberg  
 Lidiya Tridenskaya as Frau Miradowa  
 Paul Hörbiger as Kalinowski  
 Emil Rameau as Chef des Warenhauses 
 Karl Falkenberg as Kriminalkommissar 
 Hilde Schenk
 Ludwig Stössel

References

Bibliography
 Hans-Michael Bock and Tim Bergfelder. The Concise Cinegraph: An Encyclopedia of German Cinema. Berghahn Books.

External links

1929 films
Films of the Weimar Republic
Films directed by Fred Sauer
German silent feature films
German black-and-white films